Stare may refer to:

Places
Staré, a village and municipality in Michalovce District in the Kosice Region of eastern Slovakia
Stare, Oborniki County in Greater Poland Voivodeship (west-central Poland)
Stare, Piła County in Greater Poland Voivodeship (west-central Poland)
 Stare Selo, Sumy Oblast, village in Ukraine

People
Frederick J. Stare (1911–2002), American nutritionist
Matej Stare (born 1978), Slovenian former racing cyclist
Ragnar Stare (1884–1964), Swedish sport shooter
Ward Stare (born 1982), American conductor

Music
Stare (indie band), an English band
Stare (album) and its title track, by Gorky Park
"Stare", song by Ty Dolla Sign Beach House 3

See also
Staring, a prolonged gaze or fixed look